Gay Robins is an art historian. She was formerly the Samuel Candler Dobbs Professor of Art History at Emory University. She now holds the title of professor emerita. She also assisted the Michael C. Carlos Museum as a faculty consultant for Ancient Egyptian Art. Her work focuses on ancient Egyptian art, composition, gender and sexuality.

Robins earned a D.Phil. from University of Oxford in 1981.

Works
 Egyptian Painting and Relief (Shire Publications, 1986)
 Women in Ancient Egypt (British Museum Press and Harvard University Press, 1993)
 Proportion and Style in Ancient Egyptian Art (University of Texas Press, 1994)
 The Art of Ancient Egypt (British Museum Press and Harvard University Press, 1997)

References

Living people
American art historians
Emory University people
Women art historians
Year of birth missing (living people)